Jasmin Schwiers (born 11 August 1982 in Eupen, Belgium) is a German actress.

Life and career
Schwiers grew up in the German-speaking community in eastern Belgium. She began her career in children's theatre, and later made appearances in several German TV series and television movies. She got her breakthrough in 1998 as the daughter of Rita Kruse, played by Gaby Köster, in the RTL comedy series Ritas Welt. The following year she made her cinema debut, and by the time she graduated from high school, she had worked on about 20 productions.

In addition to acting, Schwiers organizes creative groups for children at Bleiberger Fabrik, an educational facility in Aachen, Germany, and is an ambassador for the German Children's Hospice Association in Olpe, Germany. In 2012, she recorded the song "Dann bin ich zu Haus" with musician Gregor Meyle.

Schwiers lives in Cologne and is married to actor Jan van Weyde. Their first daughter was born in August 2014 and they had a second daughter in May 2019. Her brother Rene is a musician in the Kölschrock group Kasalla.

Selected filmography

Awards and recognition
 2000: "Günter-Strack-Fernsehpreis" at Studio Hamburg for outstanding performance in the film Heimliche Küsse – Verliebt in ein Sex-Symbol
 2005: "Lilli Palmer & Curd Jürgens Gedächtniskamera" prize at the Goldene Kamera.

References

External links

 
 

1982 births
Living people
People from Eupen
German film actresses
Belgian emigrants to Germany
German television actresses